Giulio Balestrini (19 July 1907 in Saronno – ?) is an Italian football player.

Honours
 Serie A champion: 1929/30.

External links

1907 births
Year of death missing
Italian footballers
Serie A players
Inter Milan players
Italian expatriate footballers
Expatriate footballers in Switzerland
Italian expatriate sportspeople in Switzerland
FC Lugano players
Association football midfielders